Errie Claassens (born 27 October 1981) is a former South Africa rugby union player. Errie is the brother of Toulon player Michael Claassens who plays at scrum half and has represented the Free State Cheetahs and the Springboks.

Claassens moved to the UK in 2005 to sign for the Rotherham Titans where he spent four seasons, developing from a bit part player into a proven try scorer.

In 2009 he moved to London Welsh where he was to further his reputation with a strong try scoring record and a number of sparkling individual performances. He has a reputation as a skilful and pacey broken play runner who can play at both full back and winger.

Errie formerly played as a fullback or winger for Worcester Warriors.

Claassens was named as part of the Rugby Times magazine 2009/2010 RFU Championship "Dream Team" thanks to his consistently strong play and try scoring reputation.

In 2013, Errie Claassens signed a contract to join Bristol Rugby in the RFU Championship. However, on 21 May 2014, he left Bristol by mutual consent as he officially joined London Scottish on a two-year contract.

On 27 January 2015, Claassens announced his retirement from professional rugby due to ongoing injuries.

References

External links
London Welsh Profile

1982 births
Living people
London Welsh RFC players
Rotherham Titans players
South African rugby union players
South African expatriate rugby union players
Expatriate rugby union players in England
South African expatriate sportspeople in England
Worcester Warriors players
Rugby union players from the Free State (province)
Rugby union wings
Rugby union fullbacks